Sgt. Stubby: An American Hero is a 2018 computer-animated adventure film centering on the real-life Sergeant Stubby, a stray Boston Terrier. Directed and co-written by Richard Lanni, it features the voices of Logan Lerman, Helena Bonham Carter and Gérard Depardieu. The film was released in North America on April 13, 2018, by Fun Academy Motion Pictures. It received generally positive reviews from critics, who praised it for its "sensitivity and charm", but was a box office bomb, grossing less than $5 million against its $25 million budget.

Plot 
With World War I looming, young U.S. Army doughboy Robert Conroy (Logan Lerman) has his life forever changed when a Boston Terrier puppy with a stubby tail wanders into camp, as the men of the 102nd Infantry Regiment, 26th Infantry Division train on the parade grounds of Yale University. Conroy gives his new friend a name, a family, and a chance to embark on the adventure that would define a century.

Despite lacking formal military working dog training, Stubby and his human companions find themselves in the trenches of the Western Front in France and on the path to history. French poilu Gaston Baptiste (Gérard Depardieu) befriends the duo and accompanies them along their epic journey through harsh conditions and incredible acts of courage.

As narrated by Robert's sister Margaret (Helena Bonham Carter), Stubby's combat service includes sniffing incoming gas attacks, finding wounded allies in No Man's Land, and even catching a German infiltrator in the trenches. Back home, Stubby's exploits are retold in newspapers across the country.

For his valorous actions, Stubby is still recognized as the most decorated dog in American history and the first canine ever promoted to the rank of Sergeant in the United States Army.

Cast 
 Logan Lerman as Robert Conroy
 Helena Bonham Carter as Margaret Conroy
 Gérard Depardieu as Gaston Baptiste
 Jordan Beck as Elmer Olsen, Butcher Shop Owner
Jim Pharr as Hans Schroeder
 Jason Ezzell as Sergeant Ray Casburn
 Nicholas Rulon as Captain George S. Patton
Brian Cook as Clarence Ransom Edwards

Production 
On November 8, 2016, it was announced that Fun Academy Media Group, Ltd. – a new family entertainment production company headquartered in Kinsale, County Cork, Ireland – would produce an animated film based on the life of the World War I dog, Sergeant Stubby, and would self-distribute in North America through Columbus, Georgia-based subsidiary Fun Academy Motion Pictures. The film was animated by Mikros Image in Montreal and Paris, was directed by Richard Lanni, and written by Lanni with Mike Stokey II. The film involved Bibo Bergeron as head of story, and featured an original score composed by Patrick Doyle.

Sgt. Stubby himself does not speak, as the filmmakers wanted to maintain as much historical accuracy as possible while still making the film's portrayal of World War I accessible to children.

Release 
The film was released in United States and North America on April 13, 2018, by Fun Academy Motion Pictures. On June 15, 2017, Fun Academy Motion Pictures released a teaser trailer for the film on their YouTube channel. On December 1, 2017, the first theatrical teaser trailer was released in theaters across North America and full trailer released on February 27, 2018.

Knowing the challenges a comparatively low-budget animated feature would have against studios who regularly spend hundreds of millions in marketing alone, Fun Academy's release strategy relied heavily on the real Stubby's existing fame by engaging cause-related groups, non-profits, military veterans, and educational organizations to establish a grassroots support base. The film was endorsed by the Humane Society of the United States, American Legion, Armed Services YMCA, and the United States World War One Centennial Commission. The filmmakers also adopted a dog, "Stubs" (originally "Barnaby"), from partner shelter Dallas Pets Alive to appear at events and serve as a "spokesdog" for shelter animals.

Sgt. Stubby's world premiere occurred on March 27, 2018, at the Regal L.A. LIVE in downtown Los Angeles. The premiere was co-sponsored by Variety, the Children's Charity and benefitting the Boys & Girls Club of Boyle Heights, with 15 additional locations across the U.S. and Canada hosting free screenings for children in their communities on the following day.

On April 8, 2018, Sgt. Stubby hosted a second premiere in Sgt. Stubby's hometown of New Haven, Connecticut at the Bow Tie Cinemas, located only a few blocks away from the actual location Stubby was found in 1917. The event was hosted by the Connecticut State Library and National Guard Association of Connecticut, with hundreds of Connecticut National Guard soldiers and their families – including current members of Sgt. Stubby's 102nd Infantry Regiment – in attendance. A third and final premiere event was held on April 11, 2018, for Fun Academy Motion Pictures' U.S. headquarters at the National Infantry Museum and Soldier Center in Columbus, Georgia.

The film's wide opening on April 13, 2018, was originally slated behind Rampage (original release date: April 20) and Avengers: Infinity War (original release date: May 4). On March 1, 2018, Walt Disney Studios Motion Pictures announced a surprise release date change for Avengers, moving it up by one week to April 27. Rampage's distributor, Warner Bros., then announced that Rampage would also shift up by a week, landing their Dwayne Johnson-starring blockbuster on top of Sgt. Stubby's April 13 release date. That same weekend, independent filmmaker Wes Anderson's stop motion feature Isle of Dogs expanded into wide release in over 1,900 locations after having opened limited on March 23 and amassing solid critical buzz.

The combination of competing blockbusters' massive marketing budgets and another, better-known indie animation about dogs was more than first-time distributor Fun Academy could overcome; as a result, Sgt. Stubby: An American Hero opened on 1,633 theaters across the U.S. and Canada at No. 16 for the weekend and was pulled by most locations the following week to clear room for Avengers: Infinity War.

In a Reddit AMA in December 2018, one of the film's producers and voice actors, Jordan Beck, delivered this response to a question about the film being a box office bomb:Imagine the pitch for a movie like Stubby, “We’re going to make a kids movie about The Great War, but there’s a dog that gets wounded, but he’s okay in the end.” This was always going to be a risky undertaking and we knew we would have challenges, but it was an experiment to prove that there was an appetite for a different type of content.

In this modern era, Box Office is only one of the revenue streams, there’s home media, Pay and non Pay TV, SVOD, airlines, foreign territories. Yes, our box office was not good, but that was not because we had a bad movie; it was because our release strategy was wrong and we didn’t have the big bucks to compete with the major studios, especially after Disney moved "The Avengers: Infinity War" up by a week and caused Warner Bros. to move "Rampage" onto our release date.

All in all, for a first effort, we are happy where we are going as Stubby begins to expand around the world, Paramount have come onboard for home media and we have kept all our TV and SVOD rights.

Home media 
The movie was released DVD, Blu-Ray, Digital, and VOD in the United States and Canada by Paramount Home Media Distribution and Fun Academy Media Group on December 11, 2018. On February 11, 2019, Fun Academy released Sgt. Stubby: An Unlikely Hero on DVD and Blu-ray in the United Kingdom and Ireland, with Digital and VOD through Sky TV. The film also premiered on HBO in the U.S. on July 1, 2019.

Reception

Box office 
In the United States and Canada, Sgt. Stubby: An American Hero was released alongside the openings of Truth or Dare and Rampage, and the wide expansion of Isle of Dogs, and was projected to gross around $2 million from 1,633 theaters in its opening weekend. However, due to very little marketing done on the film, It made $350,000 on its first day and $1.3 million over its opening weekend, finishing 16th.

Critical response 
The website's critical consensus reads, "Sgt. Stubby: An American Hero opens a vibrantly animated window into history with the surprisingly true – and poignant – tale of a distinguished canine combat veteran." On Metacritic, the film has a weighted average score of 58 out of 100, based on 14 critics, indicating "mixed or average reviews". Audiences polled by CinemaScore gave the film an average grade of "A" on an A+ to F scale.

Accolades 
Sgt. Stubby has received numerous awards, endorsements, and festival laurels. The film was also awarded the Parents' Choice Gold Award and The Dove Foundation's All Ages Seal of Approval – despite not containing any explicitly faith-based messaging – as well as top honors from the National Parenting Center, the Hot Diggity Awards, and the Tillywig Toy & Media Awards.

Sequels and spin-offs 
Fun Academy has announced a slate of follow-up media including two planned feature film sequels following Stubby's return home, as well as a prequel television series.

The Stubby Squad 
On November 21, 2019, Fun Academy announced a new membership service, The Stubby Squad, a hybrid over-the-top channel and crowdfunding platform offering original streaming programming, downloadable crafts, and forum/blogs to interact with the filmmakers behind the scenes as they develop their announced slate which includes two additional Sgt. Stubby features and a prequel television series.

The Stubby Squad's available members-only content at launch included an original documentary series called In the Pawprints of History with writer/director Richard Lanni traveling to the real locations visited by Stubby and the 102nd Infantry Regiment across France, as well as a graphic novel cookbook Cooking with Gaston, featuring the character voiced in the film by Gérard Depardieu as he introduces kid-friendly French recipes and gardening tips.

Stubby & Friends 
Stubby & Friends is a free web comic written by Scott Christian Sava (Animal Crackers, The Dreamland Chronicles, Spider-Man) and illustrated by Tracy Bailey (The Dreamland Chronicles, Kung Fu Panda). The first printed anthology was released in October 2020.

Stubby: The Series 
An animated television series is in development, which would act as a prequel to the film and focus on Stubby's life as a street dog in New Haven, Connecticut circa 1915–1917. The filmmakers have stated Charlie Chaplin's The Kid as a source of inspiration to tell the story of kids and animals living on the outskirts of an industrial capitol of the early 20th century through a series of comedic misadventures. The series is currently being developed by writers Scott Christian Sava, Audry Taylor (Pet Robots), and David Wise (Teenage Mutant Ninja Turtles, Batman: The Animated Series).

Film Sequels 
After the war, the real Sgt. Stubby was featured in parades and events, including the first American Legion convention in 1919. He also met three sitting presidents – Woodrow Wilson, Warren G. Harding, and Calvin Coolidge – and visited the White House twice. In 1919, Stubby was offered a contract by New Haven-based vaudeville impresario Sylvester Z. Poli for a series of engagements. In 1921, General John J. Pershing awarded Stubby a medal from the Humane Education Society at a White House ceremony that received national print coverage. That same year, he became the mascot for the Georgetown Hoyas and is credited as inventing the halftime show as he performed tricks during football games, while Conroy juggled his studies at Georgetown Law with his job as a special agent of the Bureau of Investigation (precursor to the FBI).

Fun Academy has announced Sgt. Stubby: An American Hero as the first chapter of a planned cinematic trilogy, with the second film dealing with vaudeville, the entertainment industry and the challenges faced by soldiers returning from WWI, while the third film would feature Conroy and Stubby fighting crime during Prohibition.

References

External links 
 Official website
 
 
 
 

2018 films
2010s war adventure films
2018 computer-animated films
2010s French animated films
French war adventure films
Animated films about dogs
Animated war films
Films about war dogs
Films scored by Patrick Doyle
Animated films based on actual events
Western Front (World War I) films
American World War I films
Animated drama films
World War I films based on actual events
Films set in Connecticut
Films set in France
Cultural depictions of George S. Patton
Films about the United States Army
2010s English-language films